Nine ships of the French Navy have been named in honour of Abraham Duquesne:

 , a 74-gun ship of the line
 , a captured Russian 73-gun ship, used as a school ship
  a  80-gun ship of the line
 , a steam and sail ship of the line
  an unprotected cruiser
 Duquesne (1914), an unbuilt  
 , a heavy cruiser (1924–1955)
 , a 
 A Barracuda-class submarine is scheduled to bear the name

See also
, a  74-gun ship of the line, was started as Duquesne before being renamed.

French Navy ship names